This is the history of St. Columban parish in Chillicothe, Missouri.

The first St. Columban church was built in 1858 by John Joseph Hogan, who became the first Bishop of the Diocese of Saint Joseph in 1868.
 
In 1872, St. Joseph's Academy boarding and day school (to the left) began its 97-year tradition. In 1917 the first boy was admitted. The Sisters of St. Joseph of Carondelet in St. Louis ran the school for 63 years, until 1935 when the Sisters of St. Francis of Savannah replaced them.  In 1905 the Franciscans would write: "The prosperous condition of the Church in Chillicothe is greatly due to the Academy."

The Friars Minor, who had come to the United States in 1875 fleeing the Kulturkampf in Germany, came to Chillicothe in 1878 at the invitation of Hogan. They took charge of the parish and the next year, across Trenton Street from the Academy, built the present church, designed by Franciscan Brother Adrian Wewer. In 1880 a parish elementary school, College Hall, opened.

In 1892 the present rectory was built as a Franciscan monastery with 30 rooms plus a spacious attic. The previous rectory was located directly to the east of the church and needed to be moved to make way for an expansion of the church building. The parish then numbered about 100 families, fairly evenly divided between farmers, railroad people, and other business people. In 1894 the church was expanded, adding an apse and two transepts containing large stained-glass windows made by George A. Misch and Brothers of Chicago. The south window depicts the three patrons of the Franciscan order: St. Clare, St. Louis IX, King of France, and St. Elizabeth. The north window shows the Holy Family of Jesus, Mary, and Joseph. The four stained-glass windows in the apse depict St. Francis receiving the stigmata, the Annunciation, the child Jesus appearing to St. Anthony, and St. Margaret Mary Alacoque receiving the devotion to the Sacred Heart. Much of the statuary dates back to the late 19th century and was manufactured in Munich, Germany.

In 1895 St. Joseph church (left) was built just south of the railroad tracks on the east side of the highway, and the parish was divided at Jackson Street. St. Joseph closed in 1956, to the dismay of some in its close-knit community. 
 
A census taken in 1904 counted 42 German families, mostly farmers, 56 Irish families, mostly railroad workers, and 8 French families. In 1904 a new, white-oak main altar with ornate reredos was constructed, along with an additional two side altars of white walnut dedicated to St. Joseph and St. Anthony (right). The side altars of the Sacred Heart and the Blessed Mother were original to the church and also made of white walnut. By 1907 the parish census counted 738 people. The Catholic influence in the Chillicothe area was evidenced by the Franciscan's Historical Sketches of the parish (1905), which contained over 100 advertisements of one-quarter page or more.

In 1910, a German-crafted nativity scene set with near life-size figures was purchased, and after a century is still in use. In 1913 Thomas Bush painted a mural above each outer side altar: Jesus Healing and Jesus at the home of Martha and Mary. Additionally, murals of the Ascension and Assumption were painted on both sides of the main altar. In 1913 St. Columban elementary school was built (to the right), and currently serves as classrooms for pre-school, kindergarten, first grade, music, and middle school science. In July 1914, the Franciscans left the parish and diocesan priests managed the parish until 1971 when Benedictine monks from Conception Abbey took charge. In 1998 the Benedictines left and the parish reverted to the diocese. 

In 1957 the St. Joseph Academy building was razed to make way for Bishop Hogan Elementary School (left), which currently enrolls around 140 students in preschool through 8th grade. The academy moved to the St. Columban School building and continued until 1969, when the building was converted for pre-school and elementary use.The church building has a shrine-like atmosphere with 32 statues, 4 murals, 2 paintings, beautiful stained-glass windows, and stations of the cross. An additional 10 statues are located in a small park/shrine to Mary to the south of the church. In 2015 the parish counted 460 families.

In 2017, the interior of the church was restored back to what it looked like at its artistic height in 1914 (see before (left) and after (right)). The first mass celebrated in the newly restored church was held on August 6, 2017.   

In 2018, the communion rail was restored and put back in place.  

The interior of the rectory was restored in 2021.

Gallery

References

19th-century Roman Catholic church buildings in the United States
Religious organizations established in 1858
Roman Catholic churches completed in 1879
Churches in the Roman Catholic Diocese of Kansas City–Saint Joseph
Gothic Revival church buildings in Missouri
1858 establishments in Missouri
Roman Catholic churches in Missouri
Churches in Livingston County, Missouri
Chillicothe, Missouri